Aliabad-e Yek may refer to:
 Aliabad-e Yek, Baft
 Aliabad-e Yek, Rafsanjan
 Aliabad-e Yek, Ravar
 Aliabad-e Shomareh-ye Yek, Sirjan County